Fami (also Romanized as Famī; also known as Pambi) is a village in Khaledabad Rural District, Emamzadeh District, Natanz County, Isfahan Province, Iran. At the 2006 census, its population was 998, in 234 families.

References 

Populated places in Natanz County